Christian "Greko" Jakobsen (born 27 March 1993) is a Danish professional footballer who plays for Danish 1st Division club Hvidovre IF.

Club career

Hvidovre
A youth product of Hvidovre IF, Jakobsen made his senior debut for the first team as an under-19 player against Rishøj Boldklub. On 2 November 2012, he scored a hat-trick after coming on as a substitute in a 2nd Division match against IF Skjold Birkerød. On 15 January 2013, Jakobsen signed a new two-year contract with Hvidovre.

Roskilde
On 8 August 2014, it was announced that Jakobsen would be the new signing of FC Roskilde valid from the new year, as he would become a free agent. There, he was set to be the replacement for Emil Nielsen, who had moved to Norwegian club Rosenborg.

He made his debut for Roskilde on 25 March 2015, in a 0–2 defeat against HB Køge in the 1st Division. A strong six-month stretch for the club, in which he scored 7 goals in 14 appearances and became club top goalscorer that season, attracted considerable interest from Danish Superliga clubs.

Brøndby
On 18 June 2015, Jakobsen signed a four-year contract with Danish Superliga club Brøndby. He made his debut for the club in the Danish Cup, scoring four goals in a 7–0 win over Holbæk B&I.

He made his Superliga debut for Brøndby on 27 September 2015, when he came on the pitch in the 74th minute, replacing Magnus Eriksson in the 1–0 victory against Copenhagen.

SønderjyskE
Jakobsen signed with SønderjyskE on 28 January 2017. He made his debut for the club 17 February 2017 in a 0–3 defeat against Esbjerg fB. On 21 May, he scored his first goals for the club – a hat-trick – to secure a 3–0 win against his former club Brøndby.

Lyngby
On 3 August 2020, Jakobsen signed a two-year deal with Lyngby Boldklub. He suffered relegation to the Danish 1st Division with the club on 9 May 2021 after a loss to last placed AC Horsens. On 28 May 2022, Lyngby Boldklub announced that Jakobsen's expiring contract would not be extended, making him a free agent after the 2021–22 season.

Return to Hvidovre
In June 2022, Jakobsen signed with Hvidovre IF, the club where he had started his career. Jakobsen made his debut on 24 July 2022 against Næstved Boldklub, where he also scored his first goal for his new club.

Personal life
Before turning professional at Roskilde, Jakobsen studied economics at the University of Copenhagen next to playing football for Hvidovre.

Honours
SønderjyskE
Danish Cup: 2019–20

References

External links
 Christian Jakobsen on Soccerway

1993 births
Living people
Footballers from Copenhagen
Danish men's footballers
Danish Superliga players
Danish 1st Division players
Danish 2nd Division players
BK Skjold players
Hvidovre IF players
FC Roskilde players
Brøndby IF players
SønderjyskE Fodbold players
Lyngby Boldklub players
Association football wingers